Highway is a 1982 Soviet drama film directed by Viktor Tregubovich.

Plot 
The film tells about the work of the railway, the throughput of which is lower than necessary, which led to a disaster.

Cast 
 Kirill Lavrov as Urzhumov
 Vsevolod Kuznetsov as Zhelnin
 Lyudmila Gurchenko as Gvozdeva
 Pavel Semenikhin as Sanka
 Marina Tregubovich as Lyudmila
 Vladimir Gostyukhin as Boychuk
 Ivan Agafonov as Shilov
 Vladimir Menshov as Potapov
 Sergei Prokhanov as Student
 Mikhail Pogorzhelsky as Urzhumov's assistant

References

External links 
 

1982 films
1980s Russian-language films
Soviet drama films
1982 drama films